Ankhon Mein Tum Ho is a 1997 Bollywood romantic drama thriller film directed by Ashim Samanta and produced by Shakti Samanta.

The film stars Sharad Kapoor, Suman Ranganathan and Rohit Roy in lead roles. The film revolves around the frustrated love story of Prem Kapoor (Rohit Roy) and Pooja (Suman Ranganathan), because she is destined to kill her beau according to the stars.

The film is today best remembered as Ashok Kumar's last movie. The film was simultaneously shot  in Bengali as Achena Atithi.The song "Har Ek Muskurahat" was huge hit and still has good popularity.

Plot
This story is about Prem, Pooja, Pratap and Ranjit. Prem loves Pooja very much and wants to marry her. But Prem's family astrologer says that if Pooja marries Prem, then Prem would meet with an untimely death. Prem's grandfather does not support the marriage. He tells Pooja everything and orders her to leave Prem forever. Pooja leaves Prem and marries Pratap. Pratap is a famous businessman and he loves Pooja very much. Ranima, Pratap's mother is a patient of cardiac problems and dotes on Pooja. During their honeymoon in Switzerland Pratap dies in an accident. Pooja doesn't reveal the news to Ranima. One day during Durga Pooja, Pooja suddenly sees Pratap who in reality is an imposter - Ranjit. Ranjit kills Ranima and when Pooja sees the incident she shoots at Ranjit, but unfortunately the bullet goes into Mamababu's chest and he succumbs. Ranjit calls the police and tells them that Pooja has killed Ranima and Mamababu. The police arrest Pooja. Prem fights the case for Pooja and in court Prem proves that Ranjit is the murderer. Then police arrest Ranjit while Prem and Pooja ring the wedding bells.

Cast
Rohit Roy as Prem
Sharad Kapoor as Pratap Burman / Ranjeet
Suman Ranganathan as Pooja
Ashok Kumar as Kapoor
Raakhee as Ranimaa
Satyen Kappu as Public Prosecutor Gupta
Ram Mohan as Doctor
Pramod Muthu as Mohan

Soundtrack

Bengali tracklist

References

External links
 

1997 films
1990s Hindi-language films
Films scored by Anu Malik
Films directed by Ashim Samanta
Indian romantic thriller films
Indian romantic comedy-drama films
Indian multilingual films